Oskar Rudolf Jüriväli (also Oskar Rudolf Jürgenfeldt; 29 November 1884 Paide, Kreis Jerwen – 22 May 1955 in Pilistvere) was an Estonian politician and pedagogue. He was a member of I Riigikogu, representing the Estonian Labour Party. He was a member of the Riigikogu since 16 December 1921. He replaced Lui Olesk.

References

1884 births
1955 deaths
People from Paide
People from Kreis Jerwen
Estonian Labour Party politicians
Members of the Riigikogu, 1920–1923
Estonian educators